
Year 302 BC was a year of the pre-Julian Roman calendar. At the time, it was known as the Year of the Consulship of Denter and Paullus (or, less frequently, year 452 Ab urbe condita). The denomination 302 BC for this year has been used since the early medieval period, when the Anno Domini calendar era became the prevalent method in Europe for naming years.

Events 
 By place 

 Asia Minor 
 Following their agreement to work together to defeat Antigonus, Seleucus invades Asia Minor from Babylonia, while Ptolemy attacks Syria and Lysimachus moves into the western part of Asia Minor.
 Docimus, the regent of Phrygia, and Phoenix, the strategos of Lycia, desert Antigonus.
 The Macedonian general, Philetaerus, moves his allegiance from Antigonus to Antigonus' rival, Lysimachus. In return, Lysimachus makes Philetaerus guardian of the fortress of Pergamum with its treasure of some 9,000 talents.

 Greece 
 Antigonus' son Demetrius Poliorcetes attacks Cassander's forces in Thessaly. Cassander loses his possessions south of Thessaly to Demetrius. Antigonus and Demetrius crown their success by renewing the pan-Hellenic league. Ambassadors from all the Hellenic states (with the exception of Sparta, Messenia and Thessaly) meet at Corinth to elect Antigonus and Demetrius protectors of the new league.
 As Antigonus is finding his enemies closing in on him, a truce is made and the gains by Demetrius have to be abandoned. Demetrius reaches Ephesus to support his father.
 Pyrrhus is dethroned as King of Epirus by an uprising and joins Demetrius while in exile.

Births 
 Maharani Devi, Mauryan empress and wife of Ashoka 
 Xiaowen of Qin, Chinese king of the Qin State (d. 250 BC)

Deaths

References